Mucus is a slippery secretion produced by, and covering, mucous membranes

Mucus may also refer to:
 Major Mucus, a character from Earthworm Jim
 Rubella Mucus, a character from Camp Lazlo

See also 
St. Mucus or Am I Blood, a Finnish thrash metal band
Mucus Man, a character from Aqua Teen Hunger Force
Mucous membrane